René Jubeau (29 September 1905 – 21 April 1976) was a French middle-distance runner. He competed in the men's 1500 metres at the 1924 Summer Olympics.

References

External links
 

1905 births
1976 deaths
Athletes (track and field) at the 1924 Summer Olympics
French male middle-distance runners
Olympic athletes of France
Place of birth missing